939 Isberga is a background asteroid from the inner asteroid belt near the region of the Flora family. It was discovered from Heidelberg on 4 October 1920 by Karl Wilhelm Reinmuth. As was his common practice, Reinmuth gave the asteroid a feminine name without reference to any specific person.

Isberga rotates quickly, with a period of 2.9173 hours. It is also suspected to be a binary asteroid, due to a second periodicity observed in its lightcurve from 24 Feb to 4 Mar 2006. The secondary object has an orbital period of 26.8 hours, but its size is undetermined.

References

External links 
 Asteroids with Satellites, Robert Johnston, johnstonsarchive.net
 Asteroid Lightcurve Database (LCDB), query form (info )
 Dictionary of Minor Planet Names, Google books
 Asteroids and comets rotation curves, CdR – Observatoire de Genève, Raoul Behrend
 Discovery Circumstances: Numbered Minor Planets (1)-(5000) – Minor Planet Center
 
 

000939
Discoveries by Karl Wilhelm Reinmuth
Named minor planets
000939
000939
19201004